Dharmesh Singh Tomar is an Indian politician from The Bharatiya Janata Party and a member of the 16th Legislative Assembly of Uttar Pradesh of India. He represented the Dholana constituency of Uttar Pradesh from Samajwadi Party.

Early life and  education
Dharmesh Singh  Tomar was born in Ghaziabad. He attended the Chaudhary Charan Singh University and attained Master of Arts &  Bachelor of Education degrees.

Political career
Dharmesh Singh Tomar has been a MLA for one term. He represented the Dholana constituency and is a member of the Samajwadi Party political party.

Posts held

See also
Dholana
Sixteenth Legislative Assembly of Uttar Pradesh
Uttar Pradesh Legislative Assembly

References 

Samajwadi Party politicians
Uttar Pradesh MLAs 2012–2017
People from Hapur district
Chaudhary Charan Singh University alumni
1966 births
Living people
Bharatiya Janata Party politicians from Uttar Pradesh
Uttar Pradesh MLAs 2022–2027